TI InterActive! is a Texas Instruments computer program which combines the functionality of all of the TI graphing calculators with extra features into a text editor which allows you to save equations, graphs, tables, spreadsheets, and text onto a document.  TI InterActive! also includes a web browser, but it is just an embedded version of Internet Explorer.  It also works with TI Connect to share data with the TI Graphing Calculators.

References

Computer algebra systems